Martin County Courthouse is a historic courthouse building located at Williamston, Martin County, North Carolina.  It was built in 1885, and is two-story, brick, eclectic building with Italianate and Late Victorian style design elements.  It has segmental arched windows and a three-story, central square tower. At the rear of the courthouse are two- and three-story jail additions.

It was listed on the National Register of Historic Places in 1979. It is located in the Williamston Commercial Historic District.

References

County courthouses in North Carolina
Courthouses on the National Register of Historic Places in North Carolina
Victorian architecture in North Carolina
Italianate architecture in North Carolina
Government buildings completed in 1885
Buildings and structures in Martin County, North Carolina
National Register of Historic Places in Martin County, North Carolina
Individually listed contributing properties to historic districts on the National Register in North Carolina
1885 establishments in North Carolina